The Arbutus Oak was a large white oak tree in Arbutus, Maryland, situated in the southwest corner of the I-695/I-95 interchange approximately four miles southwest of Baltimore. Suffering from internal decay that caused its trunk to become unstable, it split and half and fell in 2019, at which time it was thought to be 329 years old.

Significance
It has been said that General Gilbert du Motier, Marquis de Lafayette passed by the oak tree in 1781 with his troops while en route to Elkridge during the Revolutionary War. When the highway interchange was being constructed in the 1950s, the government found Native American artifacts surrounding the tree. The historic nature of the tree prompted highway planners to adjust the highway ramp southward in order to save the tree.

Site
Located on Maryland State Highway Administration property and surrounded by interstate freeways and ramps, the tree was inaccessible to the general public. The tree and a sign bearing its name were visible to motorists on I-95 southbound, just south of the I-695 underpass. 

The Arbutus Lion's Club installed a fence around the tree in 1972. A plaque on the fence reads:

Emanuel Wade, the original landowner of the area on which the tree stood, is buried in the vicinity of the tree; his gravestone was moved from its original location to inside the fence that surrounded the tree.

Gallery

See also
 Wye Oak, a larger white oak in Wye Mills, Maryland that was destroyed by a windstorm in 2002.
 Linden Oak, a white oak tree in Bethesda, Maryland that was saved during the construction of the Washington Metro Red Line.
 Three Mile Oak, was a white oak tree near Annapolis, Maryland that was the site of George Washington's resignation as a commissioned army officer.
 Presbyterian Church in Basking Ridge, which was home to another oak tree with connections to the American Revolution and George Washington.
 List of individual trees

References

Individual oak trees
Individual trees in Maryland
Baltimore County, Maryland